ACMP may refer to

 Associated Chamber Music Players
 Association of Comics Magazine Publishers
 Aruba Certified Mobility Professional
 Advisory Committee for Malaria Prevention